Sidlesham Football Club are a football club based in Sidlesham, near Chichester, West Sussex, England. They play at the Recreation Ground.

History
Sidlesham F.C. was formed in 1921 but folded in the 1930s due to financial problems. They reformed immediately after the Second World War. In 1991 they joined the Sussex County League Division Three and in 1997, won the title and were promoted to Division Two. Two years later, after winning Division Two, they reached the top division, finishing fifth in 2002–03, the same season they recorded their best effort in the FA Vase when they got to the Second Round. However, they finished bottom of Division One two seasons later and were then relegated from Division Two in 2008–09, finishing mid-table in 2009–10 in Division Three. Two seasons later they finished bottom of Division Three and were relegated to the West Sussex League, but they were promoted straight back up to the Sussex County League Division Three, after finishing second in the West Sussex League. The Sids were crowned Division Three champions in 2012–13, but the club did not obtain promotion. The 2013–14 season brought a fifth-place finish, but they earned promotion to Division Two after finishing runners-up in 2014–15.

Ground

Sidlesham played their home games at The Recreation Ground, Selsey Road, Sidlesham, West Sussex, PO20 7RD. As of 24 September 2019, the club find themselves homeless, due to a ground-lease agreement with the parish council being terminated.

Honours
Sussex County League Division Two
Champions 1999–2000
Sussex County League Division Three
Champions 1996–97, 2012–13
 West Sussex Football League Premier Division
Champions (1): 2011–12
 West Sussex Football League Division One
Champions (1): 1963–64
Sussex County Football League Division Three Cup:
 Winners (1): 1991–92
 Runners up (2): 1994–95, 1995–96

Records
FA Cup
Preliminary Round 2003–04, 2004–05, 2005–06
FA Vase
Second Round 2002–03

References

External links

Football clubs in West Sussex
Association football clubs established in 1921
1921 establishments in England
Football clubs in England
West Sussex Football League